St Maurice's Church, Winchester was a parish church in the Church of England in Winchester, Hampshire.

The parish was united with that of St Mary Kalendar and the old church was taken down in March 1840, rebuilt to designs by the architect William Gover of Winchester, and reopened on 21 July 1842, when it was consecrated by the Bishop of Winchester.

The body of the church was taken down in the late 1950s. The only remains are the 15th-century tower, built of flint and rubble and incorporating a Norman arch, which is Grade II listed. The tower also displays a sundial and the arms of King George III.

Organ

The church contained a pipe organ dating from 1756 by Father Smith. When the church closed this was moved to St Thomas' Church, Southgate Street, and when that church closed, it moved again to St Deny's Church, Portswood, Southampton. A specification of the organ can be found on the National Pipe Organ Register.

Bells 
The tower contained six bells at the time the church was closed. 

Until 1919 they were a ring of five, however during that year the bells were taken to Gillett and Johnston of Croydon, had their canons removed and a treble added to give six bells. These were taken out and in 1957, were given to the Church of the Ascension, Bitterne Park, Southampton, where they were augmented to eight with the addition of two trebles and the tenor being recast by Mears and Stainbank.

In 2008 they were augmented to twelve with the addition of four trebles, all cast by Hayward Mills Associates, making them the world's lightest ring of twelve bells hung in a church.

Rectors

In 1682 Isaac Jones was appointed first Rector of the joint parish of St Maurice with St Mary Kalendre.

References

Grade II listed churches in Hampshire
Church of England church buildings in Hampshire